The Iberian revolt (197-195 BC) was a rebellion of the Iberian peoples of the provinces Citerior and Ulterior, created shortly before in Hispania by the Roman state to regularize the government of these territories, against that Roman domination in the 2nd century BC.

From 197 BC, the Roman Republic divided its conquests in the south and east of the Iberian Peninsula into two provinces: Hispania Citerior and Hispania Ulterior, each governed by a praetor. Although several causes have been put forward as possibly responsible for the conflict, the most widely accepted is that derived from the administrative and fiscal changes produced by the transformation of the territory into two provinces.

The revolt having begun in the Ulterior province, Rome sent the praetors Gaius Sempronius Tuditanus to the Citerior province and Marcus Helvius Blasio, to Ulterior. Shortly before the rebellion spread to the Citerior province, Gaius Sempronius Tuditanus was killed in action. However, Marcus Helvius Blasion, who upon arriving in his province ran headlong into the revolt, won an important victory over the Celtiberians at the Battle of Iliturgi. The situation was still far from under control, and Rome sent the praetores Quintus Minucius Thermus and Quintus Fabius Buteo in a further attempt to settle the conflict. However, although the latter achieved some victories, such as at the Battle of Turda, where Quintus Minucius even managed to capture the Hispanic general Besadino, they also failed to fully resolve the situation.

It was then that Rome had to send in 195 BC. the consul Marcus Porcius Cato in command of a consular army to suppress the revolt, who, when he arrived in Hispania found the entire Citerior province in revolt, with Roman forces controlling only a few fortified cities. Cato established an alliance with Bilistages, king of the Ilergetes, and had also the support of Publius Manlius, newly appointed praetor of Hispania Citerior and sent as assistant consul. Cato headed for the Iberian Peninsula, disembarked at Rhode and put down the rebellion of the Hispanics occupying the square. He then moved with his army to Emporion, where the greatest battle of the contest would be fought, against an autochthonous army vastly superior in numbers. After a long and difficult battle, the consul achieved total victory, managing to inflict 40 000 casualties on the enemy ranks. After Cato's great victory in this decisive battle, which had decimated the Hispanic forces, the Citerior province fell back under Roman control.

On the other hand, the Ulterior province remained uncontrolled, and the consul had to head towards Turdetania to support the praetors Publius Manlius and Appius Claudius Nero. Cato tried to establish an alliance with the Celtiberians, who acted as mercenaries paid by the Turdetani and whose services he needed, but failed to convince them. After a show of force, passing with the Roman Legions through Celtiberian territory, he convinced them to return to their lands. The submission of the autochthonous army was only an appearance, and when rumor spread of Cato's departure for Rome, the rebellion resumed. Cato had to act again with decision and effectiveness, defeating the rebels definitively in the battle of Bergium. Finally, Cato sold the captives into slavery and the autochthonous of the province were disarmed.

Historical background 

The Second Punic War was in its final stretch. The Carthaginian generals Magon Barca and Hasdrubal Gisco had retreated towards Gades, which allowed Scipio Africanus to take over the entire southern Iberian Peninsula. Scipio then crossed into Africa to hold a meeting with the Numidian king Syphax, whom he had previously encountered in Hispania, with the intention of forging an alliance.

Shortly thereafter, Scipio became seriously ill and seizing the opportunity, 8000 Roman soldiers, who were dissatisfied at having received lower pay than usual, and, moreover, lacked authorization to plunder enemy towns, revolted and started a mutiny; this mutiny was the perfect occasion seized by the Ilergetes and other Iberian peoples to revolt, led by the leaders Indibilis (of the Ilergetes) and Mandonius (of the Ausetani), a rebellion directed above all against the proconsuls Lucius Cornelius Lentulus and Lucius Manlius Acidinus. Lucius Manlius succeeded in defeating the Ausetani and the Ilergetes, who had rebelled against the Republic in the absence of Scipio Africanus. He returned to Rome in 199 BC, but was not granted the ovation that the senate had awarded him because of opposition from the tribune of the plebs Publius Porcius Laeca. Publius Scipio succeeded in putting down the mutiny and brought the Iberian revolt to a bloody end. Mandonius was captured and executed (205 BC), while Indibilis managed to escape.

Magon Barca and Hasdrubal Gisco left Gades with all their ships and troops to go to the Italian Peninsula in support of Hannibal, and after the departure of these forces, Rome was master of all southern Hispania. Rome now dominated from the Pyrenees to the Algarve, following the coast. The territory controlled by the Roman armies reached as far as Huesca, and from there southward to the Ebro and eastward to the sea. The victory of the Republic of Rome over Carthage in the Second Punic War left Hispania definitively in their hands.

When Scipio Africanus left after his Hispanic campaigns, the Iberian chiefs who had supported him, and who still enjoyed a certain political structure and capacity to react, considered that they were only linked by a personal relationship with their rex Scipio and had no duty to the Roman Republic, so they took up arms against the latter. Other causes for the uprising have been proposed, however, such as the death of Indibilis and Mandonius at the hands of the Romans;  or the most widely accepted, the high tributes that the Hispaniids had to pay to Rome, especially after the transformation of the territory into two provinces.

Forces in combat

First confrontations 

The Roman Republic divided in 197 BC. its conquests in the south and east of the Iberian Peninsula into two provinces: Hispania Citerior (east coast, from the Pyrenees to Cartagena), later called Tarraconensis with capital in Tarraco, and Hispania Ulterior (approximately present-day Andalusia), with capital in Corduba, each governed by a praetor. The transformation of the territory into two provinces caused important administrative and fiscal changes, and the imposition of the stipendium was not accepted by the local tribes, so that in 197 BC, just after the Second Macedonian War was over, a great revolt broke out throughout the conquered area in Hispania because of the republican spoliation.

The new provinces needed rulers, so the Republic sent the praetors Gaius Sempronius Tuditanus to Hispania Citerior and Marcus Helvius Blasion to Hispania Ulterior with a total of 8000 infants and 800 horsemen to discharge veterans, and the order to delimit the borders of the provinces. When Marcus Helvius arrived in his corresponding province he encountered a large revolt, whereupon he informed the senate. Numerous local chiefs had revolted in Hispania Ulterior, among them the regula Culcas at the head of the armies of 17 cities, and the Regulus Luxinio, commanding the forces of the cities of Carmo and Bardo. The cities of Malaca, Sexi and all of Baeturia had also joined the revolt.

Shortly thereafter, the war, which had begun in the Ulterior province, spread also to Citerior, in which its praetor, Gaius Sempronius Tuditanus, had died of wounds suffered in battle, along with many soldiers, at the end of 197 BC; and the province was left without a praetor until the following year. It is likely that Marcus Helvius himself, praetor of the Ulterior, also assumed control of the Citerior until the arrival of Sempronius' successor.

Quintus Minucius Thermus and Quintus Fabius Buteo were the praetores elected in 196 BC to take charge of Hispania Citerior and Hispania Ulterior respectively. They were given reinforcements consisting of two legions, 4000 infantry and 300 horsemen, and ordered to leave in haste for the provinces to continue the war. Quintus Minucius Thermus defeated the insurgent Budar and Besadines at an undetermined place called Turda, caused 12 000 casualties in the Hispanic ranks, and trapped general Besadines. Quintus Minucius consequently received the honor of triumphus upon his return to Rome in 195 BC

Roman victory at Iliturgi 

Given the limited success of the praetor of 196 BC in Hispania Citerior, the Roman Senate had declared it a "consular province", since the intervention of a consular army was necessary to control the situation. Elected consul in 195 BC together with his friend Lucius Valerius Flaccus it fell to Marcus Porcius Cato, the Elder by lot to take charge of Hispania Citerior. Also elected were the praetores for Hispania Ulterior and Hispania Citerior, Appius Claudius Nero and Publius Manlius, respectively, with their allotted forces, although, due to the emergency situation, they were allowed 2000 more infantrymen and 200 more horsemen, to be added to the legions their predecessors had disposed of. The consul Marcus Porcius Cato, who had been unable to prevent the annulment of the Oppian Law, embarked with his troops for Hispania to take charge of the Citerior province with Publius Manlius as assistant, leaving the Ulterior to Appius Claudius.

Marcus Helvius Blasion, although he had already handed over the government of the province to his successor, had to stay in Hispania due to a long illness. Now recovered, with a guard of 6000 soldiers posted for him by the praetor Appius Claudius Nero, he was attacked by 20 000 Celtiberians near Iliturgi. Marcus Helvius managed to repel the attackers, defeated them, and inflicted about 12 000 casualties on them. Iliturgi was occupied by the Romans, and this victory earned Marcus Helvius Blasion an ovatio granted by the senate in 195 BC; however, he was ineligible for the triumphus, having fought in a province that belonged to another praetor. Upon his arrival in Rome Marcus Helvius made delivery to the Republic of 14 732 pounds of uncoined silver, 17 023 coined and 119 439 of oscensian silver. Marcus Helvius was thus arriving in Rome two years later than planned. Such quantities of wealth taken from Hispania give an idea of the unrest of the autochthonous peoples, the probable cause of the uprising.

Landing of Cato in Hispania 

Marcus Porcius Cato the Elder was endowed by the Roman Senate with a consular army, composed of two legions, 8000 infantrymen, 15  000 allies and 800 horsemen, plus 20 ships for the transport of the troops; to all this were added as reinforcements 2000 infantrymen and 200 horsemen for each of the praetors, making a total of 50 000 which seems to be excessive if the forces of the units present in Hispania are added up one by one. men among the three armies. Cato embarked his army on 25 ships, 5 of them with allied troops, departed from Portus Lunae (Luni, Italy) and skirted the Gulf of Leon to reach Hispania, the northern part of the Citerior province. The Roman army disembarked at Rhode, in the Gulf of Roses, around June 195 BC, with its 25 quinqueremes, to defeat an autochthonous army of the area. The consul, who on his arrival in Hispania found himself in a complicated military situation, only personally carried about 20 000 men, since the rest were carried by the praetors; so that with these meager forces Cato faced the battle.

Siege of the citadel 

The Iberian settlements were usually built on hills, in strategic locations, controlling the passageways, which gave them an important advantage over enemies; they were usually surrounded by large walls, on which watchtowers and the gates of the city were arranged.

The square fell definitively in July 195 BC. Cato sacked the city and then fought against the Indians and put down the resistance of the Iberian garrison located on Puig Rom, or Rhode acropolis, surely the Citadel of Roses.

Arrival of the Roman army at Emporion 

The Roman army then landed at Emporion, and Cato the Elder had the ships return to Massalia with merchants to force his army into the fight:

(In English: "War feeds itself."), a phrase uttered by Cato during the contest when he refused to buy additional supplies for his army.

Titus Livius describes what the Roman army finds upon its arrival at Emporion:

Marcus Porcius Cato would start in Emporion, an almost island surrounded by marshes, where the Greek city and the Iberian city coexisted separated by a wall, a tough confrontation against a huge Hispanic army. Upon their arrival in the city, Cato and his troops received a warm welcome from the Greek inhabitants.

Encounter with the Ilergetes allies 

At this time three legates ilergetes arrived at the Roman camp, one of whom was the son of king Bilistages. These exposed to the consul that the Ilergetes cities were under attack, and that if they did not receive immediate help they would not be able to withstand the siege of their strongholds, for which they asked him for at least 3000 men. Cato replied that he understood the danger and concern of the Ilergetes, but that he had to fight a battle against a large army and could not spare any soldiers. The Ilergetes pleaded with him for help since they had no allies besides Rome, as they were the only ones who had remained loyal to the Republic and the rest of the autochthonous peoples were now their enemies. The legates left the camp disappointed by the Romans' response. The consul did not want to leave the allies to their fate, but neither could he afford to leave soldiers behind, so he hatched a plan to give the Ilergetes hope so that they would fight with higher morale. The next morning Cato called the legates and told them that he would help them; he ordered a third of the soldiers to prepare to go out to the aid of the Ilergetes in two days, and he did the same with the ships. The legates left the camp after seeing the soldiers embark. After a prudent time, Cato ordered the embarked soldiers to leave the ships.

Cato remained a few days on the outskirts of the city analyzing the enemy troops and training his soldiers. At this time he visited the camp Marcus Helvius, making a stop on his return journey to Rome, protected by 6000 soldiers on loan from the praetor Appius Claudius, after having won at Iliturgi. Since the area was now safe, Helvius returned the men to Appius Claudius and embarked for Rome.

Preparations for the decisive battle 

When Cato considered that his soldiers were ready to face the autochthonous in the open field, he ordered his troops to head for castra hiberna, a second camp located 3000 paces from the city on the mainland, in enemy-controlled territory, from where he whipped the rebels at night by burning their fields and plundering their crops and livestock, thus demoralizing their enemies. In this way he trained the soldiers and terrified the enemies, to the point that they dared less and less to leave the city. Moreover, the consul ordered 300 soldiers to abduct a sentry for interrogation.

Cato's army of about 20 000 men initially, to which casualties from the battle of Rhode would have to be subtracted, was vastly outnumbered by the forces of the autochthonous army. The revolted army besieging Emporion, of about 40 000 men, was partially disbanded in the harvest season, moment taken advantage of by Marcus Porcius Cato to attack the camp. Then the consul addressed his men:

Tactical disposition used by Cato 

During the night, Cato took the most advantageous position, keeping a legion in reserve, and placing the cavalry (equites) at the ends of the line and the infantry in the center; typical disposition of a "maniple army" of the Republican era. The manipuli were organized in three distinct battle lines (in Latin, triplex acies) each based on a type of heavy infantry: hastati, princeps and triarii: the hastati, infantrymen covered with leather armor, breastplates and helmets, formed in the front line of battle. They carried a wooden shield, reinforced with iron, a sword called gladius and two throwing spears known as pila (a heavy pilum and a smaller javelin). The princeps, heavy infantrymen, usually formed the second line of soldiers. They were armed and protected in the same way as the hastati, but wore lighter chain mail instead of solid armour. In the third line were the triarii. Their weapons and armor were similar to those of the princeps, with the exception that their main weapon was a pike instead of the two pila. The equites, finally, were placed on both flanks of the battle formation.

The Iberian warriors, besides being superior in numbers, also had effective weapons, such as the gladius, falcata, the soliferrum or the pugio, a dagger later adopted by Rome for its army.

Several historians have praised the quality of Iberian weapons, such as swords. Dion Cassius, Polybius, Diodorus Siculus, and Titus Livius in particular make explicit reference to the "Hispanic swords", to which they attribute an unsurpassed quality:

Development of the battle 

Early in the morning Cato the Elder sent three cohorts to the fence of the Iberian camp, which caused surprise in the Hispanics, who did not expect an attack from behind. The Roman army was then positioned between the enemies and its own camp, a maneuver used by the consul to force his men into the fight, preventing desertions. Cato then ordered the attackers to feign retreat, so that the Iberians pursued them in disorderly fashion, rushing to the outside of the camp fence, at which point the Roman cavalry appeared on their right flank; however the latter was overcome and retreated in fright, and a part of the infantry also, so that Cato had to send two relief cohorts to surround the attackers on the right, which were to arrive before the encounter of the lines of infantry.

The fear provoked in the Hispanic troops by the maneuver matched the initial fear of the Roman cavalry on the right wing. The battle was very evenly matched while fought with throwing weapons; on the right flank the Iberians dominated, while on the left and in the center the Romans were stronger, who also awaited the arrival of two reinforcing cohorts. The battle being evenly matched, in the evening, Cato attacked in wedge with three reserve cohorts, which had been waiting in the second line, after which a new battle front was established and achieved the disbandment of the Iberians. Cato ordered the second legion, which had remained in the rear, to form up and attacked the enemy camp by night. The refreshed legion arrived and concentrated at the camp fence, where the Hispanics were fiercely employed to protect it from the assailants; then Cato observed that the Iberian resistance was least at the left gate, so he ordered the hastati and princeps of the second legion to move toward it.

The defenders of the gate did not withstand the assault and the Romans managed to enter. Taking advantage of the confusion, the rest of the legion finished off the defenders and the Roman army achieved total victory. According to Valerius Antias, the Hispanics suffered 40 000 casualties in the battle. Once hostilities were over the consul gave his men rest and put the substantial booty up for sale.

After the battle not only the inhabitants of Emporion surrendered, but also those of the nearby cities. Cato treated them with propriety and even helped them, and then let them go to their homes.

End of hostilities in the province of Citerior 

With the victory at Emporion Marcus Porcius Cato had achieved the pacification of all Hispania Citerior; all the way to Tarraco all the cities were surrendering to him, and they were handing over to him the Romans they held as prisoners.

Shortly thereafter news spread that the consul was leaving with his army for Turdetania, which some Bergistani peoples took advantage of to take up arms. Cato easily put down the revolt on up to two occasions, but was not so lenient on the second and sold the vanquished into slavery. The tactic employed by Cato on this occasion was to reach the villages earlier than expected, thus attacking the revolters by surprise. After this, Cato ordered the disarmament of all the inhabitants of the province Citerior.

The consul called upon the representatives of the Hispanic cities in the area to take measures voluntarily so that they could not rebel again against Rome. Finding no response from the Hispanics Cato had the walls of all the cities torn down.

The war in the Ulterior province

Revolt of the Turdetani 

The praetors Appius Claudius Nero and Publius Manlius were in Turdetania, waging war against the Turdetani themselves and against the  Celtiberians mercenaries they had hired, achieving some victories. These were not, however, difficult victories, since the praetors had a good number of horsemen and veteran soldiers. But subsequently the Turdetani hired another 10 000 Celtiberians, and began to prepare again for combat.

After a triumphant campaign, Cato led his troops to Sierra Morena, Turdetania, in aid of the praetores Publius Manlius and Appius Claudius, to the area where the Turdetani had their mines. Turdetani and Celtiberians, mercenaries in the service of the latter, were encamped in different locations. There were initially some skirmishes between Romans and Turdetani, always with a favorable outcome for the former. Cato's tribune emissaries were sent by Cato to convince the Celtiberians to withdraw to their lands without putting up a battle or to join the Roman army, charging double what was promised by the Turdetani. Faced with this proposition the Celtiberians asked for time to think, but, as the Turdetani joined the meeting, no agreement was reached. The Celtiberians, however, decided for their part not to present battle. After losing Celtiberian military support, the Turdetani were defeated. This defeat meant the loss of their mining possessions, which forced the Turdetani to remain in the Guadalquivir valley, devoting themselves to agriculture and cattle raising.

Passing through Celtiberia 

Cato the Elder returned north across Celtiberia in order to intimidate the Celtiberians and prevent future uprisings, and in retaliation for having joined the uprising of the Turdetani. He headed towards Segontia, as rumor had reached him that it was the square where greater booty could be obtained, and besieged the city without success due to lack of time. He then headed towards Numantia, in the vicinity of which he addressed a speech to his equites.

He subsequently returned to the province Citerior, leaving part of his army with the praetores after having paid his salary to the soldiers, and taking with him seven cohorts.

Returning from Turdetania Cato achieved the subjugation of ausetani, suessetani and sedetani. The consul was able to take advantage of the unease of his allies with the Lacetani, who had taken advantage of the Roman expedition to Turdetania to raid their villages. When the Roman contingent reached the city of the Lacetani, Cato sent part of his cohorts to stand on one side and the others to stand on the opposite side. Thereupon he ordered the allies, Suessetani for the most part, to attack the wall. The Lacetani, confident that they could easily defeat the Suessetani, opened a gate and went out to meet them; the Suessetani fled and the enemies pursued them. Then the consul ordered the cohorts to enter the town immediately, who surprised the Lacetani. After this the Lacetani surrendered.

Third uprising of the Bergistani 

Subsequently the consul Marcus Porcius Cato headed back towards the Citerior province, towards the territory of the Bergistani, who had rebelled again and were resisting in the fortress of castrum Bergium.  Upon arriving in the city the Bergistani leader went to Cato to tell him that he and his people were still loyal to Rome, and that it was outsiders who had taken control of the city and were hostile to the Romans, and that they were also engaged in plundering the inhabitants of the province Citerior. In this way, Cato devises a strategy to test whether or not the Bergistani were loyal to him, and in the process conquer the square more easily. Cato then ordered the Bergistani leader that he and his loyalists should occupy the citadel when the Roman siege began, an order which the Bergistani carried out; the bandits were then surrounded and defeated. After the battle Cato ordered that the citizens who had been loyal to his plan be freed, the remaining Bergistani enslaved, and the foreign bandits executed.

Consequences

Victory management 

Once he had reduced the Hispanic insurgents settled in the territory located between the Iberus River and the Pyrenees, Cato the Elder turned his attention to the administration of the province. During his rule revenues increased, as the state's profits from the exploitation of mining resources increased, mainly silver and iron, as well as of a large mount of salt in which the consul took an interest. It seems that Cato was able to see the reasons that had motivated the revolt, surely the excessive taxes on the Hispanians; so he reorganized the collection, increasing the profit that remained in Hispania.

While Cato was still in Hispania, the new consul who was to succeed him and the successors of the praetores were elected in Rome. He was again elected consul Scipio Africanus, Cato's rival, and praetors Publius Cornelius Scipio Nasica for the province Ulterior and Sextus Digitius for Citerior. Scipio's intention was to be posted to Hispania, but the senate decided that the new consul's destination should be Italy since the Hispanic provinces had been pacified.

Because of Cato's successes in Hispania, the senate approved three days of public prayers; and resolved also that the soldiers who had acted in Hispania during the revolt be discharged.

In late 194 BC, Marcus Porcius Cato returned to Rome with a huge war trophies consisting of 25 000 pounds and 123  000 pieces in bigati of silver, 540 pieces of silver from Uesca and 1400 pounds of gold; all taken from the Hispanic peoples in their military actions. which is documented in the Fasti triumphales. Cato distributed part of the booty among the soldiers who had served under him.

The victory in the war of Hispania was a great boost to the career of Marcus Porcius Cato, as it allowed him to reach the military heights of his opponents. This success meant, in particular, that he was able to rub shoulders with his great rival Scipio Africanus.

Upon the return of Cato the Elder to Rome and the arrival of the new praetors who succeeded him in the Hispanic provinces, another rebellion occurred again. The praetor Sextus Digitius clashed on many occasions with the revolters, losing in the fighting up to half of his troops.

Continuation of the process of conquest

Celtiberia 

In Hispania, the process of conquest continued after the actions of Cato; thus, the proconsul Marcus Fulvius Nobilior subsequently fought other rebellions. Then Rome began the conquest of Lusitania, with two outstanding victories: in 189 BC that obtained by the proconsul Lucius Aemilius Paullus Macedonicus, and in 185 BC. that obtained by the praetor or proconsul Gaius Calpurnius Pisonus.

The conquest of Celtiberia was initiated in 181 BC by Quintus Fulvius Flaccus, who managed to defeat the Celtiberians and subdue some territories, obtaining for it the honor of an ovation in 191 BC. However, most of the conquest and pacification operations were carried out by praetor Tiberius Sempronius Gracchus from 179 BC to 178 BC. Sempronius took some thirty citys and villages, using various types of strategies, sometimes making pacts and sometimes stirring up rivalry between Celtiberians and Vascones, and founded over the already existing city of Ilurcis the new city of Gracchurris.

Lusitania 

Subsequently problems would come from Lusitania, where from 155 BC. Punicus conducted major campaigns in territory controlled by the Republic, plundering territories in Baetica and reached the Mediterranean Sea coast, with the Vettones as allies. He achieved great victories such as the one against the Roman praetors Marcus Manlius and Lucius Calpurnius Piso Caesoninus.

From 147 BC the republic should face a new Lusitanian enemy, the initially shepherd Viriathus, who would become from then on a great headache for Rome, so much so that he came to be called the terror of Rome. He managed to flee the slaughter of Servius Sulpicius Galba in 151 BC, and subsequently rebelled, achieving several victories against the Romans. He also conquered several cities, such as Tucci (probably present-day Martos or Tejada la Vieja), and the region of Bastetania. He was killed around 139 BC.

The sources 

The treatment of the conflict has been greater and more exhaustive than that of other similar campaigns in Hispania. Surely the character of Cato the Elder and his works were the cause, since they aroused great interest in later authors. Among these it is worth mentioning Plutarch and Appian, but above all Titus Livius, who was who treated with greater length and depth the account of the events. No author has collected the campaign in its entirety.

Cato 
In his writings, Cato knew how to give importance to his successes, especially helped by the achievement of the triumphus, which redounded even more in the compliments he addressed to himself. Moreover, this was the only episode in his career in which he had supreme command in a conflict. It is therefore logical that Cato would boast of this success in the defense of his consulship, to defend himself from the criticism of his adversaries. The entire account of the campaign would have been included in his later work the Origines, probably in the fifth book,  of which some fragments have been preserved.

Plutarch 

The biography of Cato the Elder written by Plutarch (Parallel Lives, Cato Maior) is the most detailed and the most influential in terms of knowledge of the character of those ever written. Its source is Cato himself, as Plutarch himself indicates on several occasions. He also relies on Polybius, a source likewise of Cornelius Nepos, from whom Plutarch himself obtained information. Plutarch's work, moreover, gathers information from various authors and thus makes it possible to obtain an overall view of the character.

Appian 
Appian deals with the narrative of the campaign in his work Iberia, specifically between chapters 39 and 41. In this sense it seems that in the case at hand Appian employed the most reliable ones. In large part he relies directly on Cato himself to narrate the events, while in others he relies on Livius. In chapter 41, news about the destruction of the walls, it seems that Appian retouches Livius' version or picks up that manipulation from a later author.

Titus Livius 
Titus Livius' treatment of the campaign is the most extensive and exhaustive of those preserved, and is the one that serves as the main reference for setting up the story; it should be noted in this regard that several episodes of the contest are contained only in his work, such as the description of Emporion. Livius treats the character of Cato the Elder differently from the rest of the work and with a great profusion of detail. The account of the events is found in books XXXIII and XXXIV of his work Ab Urbe condita libri. Livius' main source for the narrative of the feud is Cato himself, while for matters of a more general nature he relied on the official chronicle of the actions of the senate. Livius is, in turn, the main source for other later authors, such as Frontinus.

See also 

 Portal:Ancient Rome
 Campaign history of the Roman military
 Structural history of the Roman military
 Kingdom of Iberia
 Roman Republic
 Carthaginian Iberia

Notes

References

Bibliography

Classical sources

Modern works 

 
 
 
 
 
 
 
 
 
 
 
 
 
 
 
 
 
 
 
 
 
 
 
 
 
 
 
 
 
 
 
 
 
 
 
 
 
 
 
 
 
 
 
 
 

2nd century BC in Hispania
Rebellions against the Roman Republic
190s BC conflicts
2nd century BC in the Roman Republic
Roman conquest of the Iberian Peninsula